Beneath the Harvest Sky (previously known as Blue Potato) is a 2013 indie American drama film directed by Aron Gaudet and Gita Pullapilly. The film stars Emory Cohen, Callan McAuliffe, Sarah Sutherland, Timothy Simons, W. Earl Brown and Aidan Gillen. Beneath the Harvest Sky is about two teenage best friends in rural Maine caught up in the illegal prescription drug trade between Canada and Maine. It is a story about friendship, family and love. The film highlights social issues in rural communities and the lack of opportunities and resources for youth.

The film premiered at the 2013 Toronto International Film Festival on September 8 and had its U.S. premiere at the Tribeca Film Festival. It played theatrically before its release on the digital platforms. The film partnered with "Terra Chips" to promote and market the movie.

Plot
Dominic Roy (Callan McAuliffe) is a 17-year-old headstrong and hardworking teen who works in the local potato harvest farm to earn money to escape the struggling Maine hometown hopefully for a better future. Dominic's best friend Casper (Emory Cohen), a reckless teenager who has always dreamed with Dominic about leaving Van Buren, Maine and moving to Boston. But they need to earn enough money in order to do that. Dominic and Casper both have their own ways of earning the money.  While Dominic works hard on the farm to earn his money, Casper on the other hand works with his outlaw father Clayton (Aidan Gillen) to smuggle drugs across the border of Canada. This challenges the two best friends' friendship and loyalty towards each other.

Cast
 Emory Cohen as Casper
 Callan McAuliffe as Dominic Roy 
 Aidan Gillen as Clayton
 Timm Sharp as Badger
 Sarah Sutherland as Emma
 Zoe Levin as Tasha
 W. Earl Brown as Roger
 David Denman as George
 Carrie Preston as Kim
 Carlo Gallo as Renee
 Delaney Williams as James
 Josh Mostel as Principal
 Timothy Simons as Dayton
 Joe Cobden as Mr. Soucy
 Erik Moody as Jesse
 Kevin Corsaro as CBP officer two.

References

External links
 Beneath the Harvest Sky official website
 Beneath the Harvest Sky at the Toronto International Film Festival
 
 
 
 

2013 films
2013 drama films
American drama films
American independent films
Films set in Maine
2013 independent films
2010s English-language films
2010s American films